Natalia Valeryevna Annenko (born April 17, 1964) is a Russian former ice dancer who competed for the Soviet Union. She won the 1982 World Junior Figure Skating Championships with partner Vadim Karkachev. She later went on to compete with Genrikh Sretenski. With Sretenski, she is the 1988 European silver medalist and three-time (1986, 1987, 1989) European bronze medalist. They placed fourth at the 1988 Winter Olympics.

Annenko teamed up with Sretenski in 1982. They were coached by Ludmila Pakhomova and Tatiana Tarasova. After leaving eligible skating in 1989, they skated with Stars on Ice for four seasons.

Annenko was married to Peter Tchernyshev but they divorced after seven years. She is remarried and now known as Natalia Deller or Natalia Annenko-Deller. She coaches at the Detroit Skating Club in Bloomfield Hills, Michigan.

Competitive highlights 
(ice dance with Genrikh Sretenski)

(with Karkachev)

References

External links 
 

Soviet female ice dancers
Russian female ice dancers
Olympic figure skaters of the Soviet Union
Figure skaters at the 1988 Winter Olympics
Living people
1964 births
Figure skaters from Moscow
European Figure Skating Championships medalists
World Junior Figure Skating Championships medalists
Universiade medalists in figure skating
Universiade gold medalists for the Soviet Union
Competitors at the 1983 Winter Universiade